Derby–Shelton station (signed as Derby/Shelton) is a commuter rail station on the Waterbury Branch of the Metro-North Railroad New Haven Line, serving the cities of Derby and Shelton, Connecticut. It is the southernmost stop on the Waterbury Branch before trains merge onto the Northeast Corridor.

Station layout
The station has one three-car-long low-level side platform to the west of the single track.

The station is owned and operated by the Connecticut Department of Transportation, but Metro-North is responsible for maintaining platform lighting as well as trash and snow removal. The 75-space parking lot is managed by the Naugatuck Valley Council of Governments.

Future station
With the completion of the Waterbury Branch Signalization project upgrading capacity for future 30 minute service headways, Governor Lamont announced on November 14, 2021 that 7 new trains will be coming to the Waterbury Line in 2022 and the Derby-Shelton Train Station was a priority in getting new riders onto the line. Paired with the development of Route 34 and the new Derby-Shelton Bridge, the new station will function as a new multimodal center for Derby and its new residents. The new station received 12.6 million in Federal Funds 6 days later and later received another 12.4 from the State of Connecticut on December 21, 2021. As of 2022, the project is fully funded and expected to break ground 4 months after a bidder is chosen for the project expected construction will start around October, 2022. The new station will include a 350 foot long high level, heated boarding platform capable of accommodating 4 Shoreliner coaches. The new station will also include accessibility improvements making it fully ADA compliant with new Ticket Vending Machines and digital screens telling passengers when the next train will arrive. Lastly, the station will include new areas for buses with new technology to unload simultaneously and a waiting area for bus and train passengers.

References

External links 

Connecticut Department of Transportation "Condition Inspection for the Derby/Shelton Station" July 2002
 Station House from Google Maps Street View

Stations along New York, New Haven and Hartford Railroad lines
Metro-North Railroad stations in Connecticut
Metro-North station
Railroad stations in New Haven County, Connecticut
Transportation in New Haven County, Connecticut